The 2015–16 FC Rot-Weiß Erfurt season is the 51st season in the football club's history and 8th consecutive season in the 3. Liga, having been transferred from the Regionalliga Nord in 2008, and the 11th consecutive in the third tier of German football. In addition to the 3. Liga, will also participate in this season's edition of the Thuringia Cup. This will be the 67th season for an Erfurt club in the Steigerwaldstadion, located in Erfurt, Germany. The stadium has a capacity of 17,500 seats.

Background
In the club's previous season in the 3. Liga, they finished in 12th place. Meanwhile, in the Thuringia Cup, they went out in the quarterfinals after losing 0–1 to Einheit Rudolstadt.

Squad

On loan

Transfers

In

Out

Technical staff

Friendlies

Competitions

Overall

Overview

3. Liga

League table

Results summary

Results by round

Matches

Thuringia Cup

References

Rot-Weiss Erfurt, FC
FC Rot-Weiß Erfurt seasons